John Douglas Pringle Award or British Prize for Journalism is offered jointly by the British High Commission and the Australian National Press Club.  It is named after a distinguished journalist, John Douglas Pringle.

Winners 
 1999: Sally Sara
 2000: Claire Miller
 2001:
 2002: Melissa Sweet
 2003: Sacha Payne
 2004: Shane Wright
 2005: Not offered.

References

External links 
 Website

Australian journalism awards